Ayanur Manjunatha (born 14 November 1955) is an Indian politician. He is  member of Rajya Sabha from Karnataka State for the term Jul 2010- July 2016. He is member of Bharatiya Janata Party.

He was member of 12th Lok Sabha from Shimoga and defeated Sarekoppa Bangarappa of Congress. Earlier during 1994-98 he was Member of Karnataka Legislative Assembly.  He had studied B.A., LL.B. at Sahyadri College at Shimoga in Karnataka.

References

http://164.100.47.5/newmembers/Website/Main.aspx

1955 births
Living people
Indian Hindus
Bharatiya Janata Party politicians from Karnataka
Rajya Sabha members from Karnataka
India MPs 1998–1999
Lok Sabha members from Karnataka